Tengatangi–Areora–Ngatiarua is a Cook Islands electoral division returning one member to the Cook Islands Parliament.  Its current representative is the Hon Te Hani Brown, who has held the seat since 2018.

The electorate was created in 1981, when the Constitution Amendment (No. 9) Act 1980 adjusted electorate boundaries and split the multimember electorate of Atiu into two separate constituencies.

Members of Parliament for Tengatangi-Areora-Ngatiarua
Unless otherwise stated, all MPs terms began and ended at general elections.

Election results

2006 election

2004 election

See also
March 2019 Tengatangi-Areora-Ngatiarua by-election
November 2019 Tengatangi-Areora-Ngatiarua by-election

References

Atiu
Cook Islands electorates